Round Hill is a hamlet in central Alberta, Canada within Camrose County.

The hamlet is located in Census Division No. 10 and in the federal riding of Crowfoot.

Demographics 

Education 
Round Hill School is located in the hamlet offering Kindergarten through Grade 9 in Battle River School Division.

See also 
List of communities in Alberta
List of designated places in Alberta
List of hamlets in Alberta

References 

Camrose County
Hamlets in Alberta
Designated places in Alberta